"Sizeman and Son" was an American television play broadcast on October 18, 1956, as part of the CBS television series, Playhouse 90.

Plot
Morris Sizeman is a successful garment manufacturer in New York City. His son, Harold Sizeman, returns from the Korean War with new ideas about human rights, believing that the quest for wealth is the cause of the world's difficulties.

Cast
 Eddie Cantor as Morris Sizeman
 Mona Freeman as Marie Sizeman
 Farley Granger as Harold Sizeman
 Peter Lorre as Karp
 Carol Morris as Francine
 Lawrence Dobkin as Rosenzweig
 Dan Blocker as Lewis

Production
In September 1956, CBS announced that it had signed the noted comedian Eddie Cantor to play the lead in "Seidman & Son". Martin Manulis was the producer with Vincent J. Donahue directing. The teleplay was written by Elick Moll.

Reception
In The New York Times, J. P. Shanley called the production "shallow and unsatisfying" and Elick Moll's script "an undistinguished product from the ready-to-wear rack."

In The Pittsburgh Press, Fred Remington rated the program "way above average" and praised Peter Lorre's "wonderfully humorous performances" as an aging worker "who's not having any young whippersnapper telling him he's downtrodden."

References

1956 American television episodes
Playhouse 90 (season 1) episodes
1956 television plays